Elizabeth Sayers and John Fitzgerald were the defending champions but lost in the final 2–6, 7–5, 6–4 against Manuela Maleeva and Tom Gullikson.

Seeds

Draw

Finals

Top half

Section 1

Section 2

Bottom half

Section 3

Section 4

References
1984 US Open – Doubles draws and results at the International Tennis Federation

Mixed Doubles
US Open (tennis) by year – Mixed doubles